8th Engineer Brigade (8 Eng Bde) is an engineering support formation of the British Army, which forms part of 1st (United Kingdom) Division.

History
In August 2001, Headquarters Royal Engineers, Theatre Troops was established as a subdivision of HQ Theatre Troops based in Upavon.  On 1 April 2005, the headquarters was redesignated as part of the LANDmark review as 8th Force Engineer Brigade and subsequently took control of the three engineer groups: 12th (Air Support), 29th (Explosive Ordnance Disposal and Search), and 170th (Infrastructure Support) Engineer Groups.  The new brigade's headquarters was also based at Upavon, now at Trenchard Lines.

As part of the Army 2020 reorganisation following the Strategic Defence and Security Review 2010, HQ Theatre Troops was redesignated as Force Troops Command, while the brigade headquarters was moved to Gibraltar Barracks in Minley and subsequently took control of 25th (Close Support) Engineer Group.  However, in 2016 as part of the subsequent Army 2020 Refine changes, 25 Engineer Group was moved under direct control of 3rd (United Kingdom) Division.  Consequently, two regiments of 25 Engineer Group; 32nd and 35th Engineer Regiments were moved under 12 Engineer Group.

In August 2020, a reorganisation of the Field Army, the brigade was moved under control of 1st (United Kingdom) Division.  The Brigade has been also regionally aligned with the South Asian region as part of defence engagement.

Structure 
The current structure of the brigade as of November 2021 is as follows:

 Headquarters, 8th Engineer Brigade, at Gibraltar Barracks, Minley
 8th Engineer Brigade Combat Information Systems (CIS) Troop, Royal Engineers (V), at Aldershot Garrison
 12th (Force Support) Engineer Group, at RAF Wittering, Cambridgeshire
 32nd Engineer Regiment, Royal Engineers, at Marne Barracks, Catterick Garrison
 36th Engineer Regiment, Royal Engineers, at Invicta Park Barracks, Maidstone — regiment doubles as HQ Royal Gurkha Engineers
 39th Engineer Regiment, Royal Engineers, at Kinloss Barracks, Kinloss
 71st Engineer Regiment, Royal Engineers (V), at Waterloo Lines, Leuchars Station — paired with 32 Engineer Regiment
 75th Engineer Regiment, Royal Engineers (V), at Peninsula Barracks, Warrington — paired with 36 Engineer Regiment
 29th (Explosive Ordnance Disposal and Search) Group, at Montgomery House, Aldershot Garrison
 660 Signal Troop (EOD), Royal Corps of Signals
 29 (Explosive Ordnance Disposal and Search) Group Support Unit, at Carver Barracks, Wimbish
 28th Engineer Regiment (Counter-Chemical, Biological, Radiological, and Nuclear), Royal Engineers, at Rock Barracks, Woodbridge (NRBC Defence)
 Falcon Area Surveillance and Reconnaissance Squadron, Royal Tank Regiment, at Harman Lines, Warminster Garrison
 33rd Engineer Regiment (Explosive Ordnance Disposal and Search), Royal Engineers, at Carver Barracks, Wimbish
 35th Engineer Regiment (Explosive Ordnance Disposal and Search), Royal Engineers, at Carver Barracks, Wimbish
 101st (City of London) Engineer Regiment (Explosive Ordnance Disposal and Search), Royal Engineers (V), at Hudson House, Catford — paired with 33 Engineer Regiment
 11th Explosive Ordnance Disposal and Search Regiment, Royal Logistic Corps, at Vauxhall Barracks, Didcot
 1st Military Working Dog Regiment, Royal Army Veterinary Corps, at Saint George's Barracks, North Luffenham (Hybrid)
 101 Military Working Dog Squadron (V), in Oakham
 170th (Infrastructure Support) Engineer Group, at Chetwynd Barracks, Chilwell
 43 Headquarters and Support Squadron, at Chetwynd Barracks, Chilwell
 20th Works Group (Air Support), Royal Engineers, at RAF Wittering (Hybrid)
 510 Specialist Team (Airfields), Royal Engineers (V)
 62nd Works Group, Royal Engineers, at Chetwynd Barracks, Chilwell
 63rd Works Group, Royal Engineers, at Chetwynd Barracks, Chilwell
 65th Works Group, Royal Engineers (V), at Chetwynd Barracks, Chilwell
 66th Works Group, Royal Engineers, at Chetwynd Barracks, Chilwell

Footnotes

References

External links
 Official website

Engineer brigades of the British Army
Military units and formations established in 2005
Royal Engineers